Vasant P. Dandin  was the second Bishop of Northern Karnataka of the Church of South India:

Dandin was born on 22 April 1934, in Dharwad. He was educated at Karnataka University. In 1992 he became Moderator of the Church of South India.

Notes

20th-century Anglican bishops in India
Church of South India clergy
Indian bishops
Indian Christian religious leaders
1934 births
Karnatak University alumni
People from Dharwad
Anglican bishops of Northern Karnataka
Moderators of the Church of South India
Year of death missing